Maria de Lourdes Alcívar Crespo (born 15 November 1963) is an Ecuadorian socialite. She has been the First Lady of Ecuador since 24 May 2021 as the wife of President Guillermo Lasso. She was seen as a "key female figure" of the Creating Opportunities party.

Early life
Alcívar was born in Guayaquil in 1963, however was raised in Samborondón, Ecuador.

In 1973, Alcívar met Guillermo Lasso, whom she would marry in 1980. They have five children: María de Lourdes, Juan, Guillermo Enrique, Santiago and María de las Mercedes.

Political involvement
Alcívar was supportive of her husband and appeared in all of his campaign events in 2013, 2017 and 2021.

First Lady of Ecuador
Lasso announced his third presidential campaign for the 2017 election and narrowly advanced to the run-off in February 2021 facing Andrés Arauz. On 11 April, Lasso defeated Arauz in the run-off election making Alcívar the First Lady-designate. The following week, she accompanied her husband to met President Lenin Moreno to discuss the transition period. There, Alcívar and First Lady Rocío González Navas talked about modernizing the role of First Lady.

References

1963 births
Living people
21st-century Ecuadorian women politicians
21st-century Ecuadorian politicians
First ladies of Ecuador
People from Guayaquil